Jared & The Mill (also Jared and The Mill) was an indie rock band from Phoenix, Arizona formed in 2011. The band consists of Jared Kolesar (vocals, acoustic guitar), Michael Carter (banjo, electric guitar), Larry Gast III (electric guitar), Chuck Morriss III (bass), and Josh Morin (drums). It was announced on February 17, 2021 (via Twitter) that the band had split and Kolesar would be pursuing his solo project, Wheelwright.

History
Jared & The Mill met through mutual friends while in college, at Arizona State University.

Discography

Western Expansion – album (2013)

Track listing
Breathe Me In
Returning Half
In Our Youth
Ides of Fall
Love to Be Found
What Would You Do
Talewind
Brave Young Man
Know Your Face
Just For Now
Wrecking Ball
Western Expansion

Life We Chose – EP (2015)

Track listing
Crawl
Hold On
She
Messengers
Young & Dumb
Life We Chose

Jared and the Mill on Audiotree Live – EP (2016)

Track listing
Home
Hold On
Messengers
Keep Me Going
Young & Dumb

Orme Dugas – EP (2016)
Jared & the Mill commenced the "Keep Me Going" tour in August 2016 around the United States to promote the EP Orme Dugas which was released on September 9, 2016.

Track listing
Lost, Scared & Tired
Keep Me Going
Still Alone
Ghosts
Song for a Girl

This Story Is No Longer Available – album (2018)

Track listing
 Soul in Mind
 Broken Bird
 Break in the Ether
 Valley of the Sun
 Hope
 Kelsee's Shelves
 Wilderness Call
 Dark Highways
 Jared and the Mill Sucks
 Tightrope Walker
 Feels Like
 Chisel
 Dying Fear
 Monica Voicemail
 Since I Met You
 Books

Eliza – single (2020)

Track listing
 Eliza

References

American folk rock groups
Indie rock musical groups from Arizona
Musical groups from Phoenix, Arizona
2011 establishments in Arizona